The 18205 / 18206 Durg–Nautanwa Express is an Express train belonging to the South East Central Railway zone that runs between  and  in India. It is currently being operated with train numbers 18205/18206 on a weekly basis.

Service

The 18205/Durg–Nautanwa Express has an average speed of 43 km/hr and covers 1151 km in 26h 55m. The 18206/Nautanwa–Durg Express averages 39 km/hr and covers 1151 km in 29h 20m.

Route & halts 

The important halts of the train are:

 
 
 
 
   Pendra Road

Coach composition

The train has standard  LHB rakes with a max speed of 110 kmph. The train consists of 21 coache

Traction

From Prayagraj it is hauled by an twin from wap 7 Gorakhpur  locomotive to Nautanwa, with the same being used in the opposite direction

Direction reversal

Train reverses its direction 2 times:

See also 

 
 
 Durg–Nautanwa Express (via Varanasi)
 Durg–Ajmer Express

Notes

References

External links 

 18205/Durg–Nautanwa Express
 18206/Nautanwa–Durg Express

Transport in Durg
Transport in Nautanwa
Express trains in India
Rail transport in Chhattisgarh
Rail transport in Madhya Pradesh
Rail transport in Uttar Pradesh
Railway services introduced in 2006